Devender Singh (born 6 November 1947) is a contemporary Indian artist (painter) from Punjab.

Early life
Singh was born on 6 November 1947 in Amritsar, Punjab. His father, Sewak Singh (G.D. Art Lahore), was a well-known artist himself.

Education and training
He received his formal education at Mumbai, Ludhiana and Chandigarh.

Painting
His well-known paintings include the series made on Bara Maha. Singh started his career with illustrations made for the very famous Amar Chitra Katha comics. His Sikh historical paintings are well known among Punjabis throughout the world.

References

External links
Official Website
from Sadapunjab.com
Sikh-Heritage.co.uk
Directory Punjab
Brush with Sikh History by Nonika Singh, The Tribune
The hand that gives form to Sikh history, Rathi A.Menon, Indian Express
Devender Singh's Fulsome Canvases, By Sumeet Arora
The Tribune

Indian Sikhs
Indian male painters
Artists from Amritsar
Punjabi people
Indian Expressionist painters
1947 births
Living people
20th-century Indian painters
Painters from Punjab, India
20th-century Indian male artists
21st-century Indian male artists